The 1971 Louisville Cardinals football team was an American football team that represented the University of Louisville in the Missouri Valley Conference (MVC) during the 1971 NCAA University Division football season. In their third season under head coach Lee Corso, the Cardinals compiled a 6–3–1 record (3–2 against conference opponents) and outscored opponents by a total of 190 to 111.

The team's statistical leaders included John Madeya with 1,045 passing yards, Howard Stevens with 1,429 rushing yards and 78 points scored, and Gary Barnes with 404 receiving yards.

Schedule

References

Louisville
Louisville Cardinals football seasons
Louisville Cardinals football